Gharbi is the second largest of the Kerkennah Islands off the north coast of Tunisia. The name means "Westerner" in Arabic. Chief town is Mellita. The island has an area of 69 km2. The largest island of the group, Chergui, means "Easterner" in Arabic.

Islands of Tunisia
Mediterranean islands